Voyage is the ninth and final studio album by the Swedish pop group ABBA, released 5 November 2021. With ten songs written by Benny Andersson and Björn Ulvaeus, it is the group's first album of new material in forty years.

Voyage debuted atop the charts of Australia, Austria, Belgium, the Czech Republic, Denmark, Finland, France, Germany, Iceland, Ireland, the Netherlands, New Zealand, Norway, Sweden, Switzerland and the UK. It also became the group's highest-charting studio album ever in Canada and the United States, debuting at number two on the charts in both countries. The album was nominated for Album of the Year and Best Pop Vocal Album at the 2023 Grammy Awards, in addition to nominations for "I Still Have Faith in You" and "Don't Shut Me Down", the former for Record of the Year at the 2022 Grammy Awards (the first Grammy nomination for the group), and the latter for Record of the Year and Best Pop Duo/Group Performance at the 2023 Grammy Awards. The album has sold over 2.5 million copies worldwide.

The album was supported by the dual single release of "I Still Have Faith in You" and "Don't Shut Me Down", released alongside the album announcement on 2 September 2021. "Just a Notion" was issued as the third single on 22 October 2021, followed by the fourth single "Little Things" on 3 December. A digital concert residency in support of the album, ABBA Voyage, opened in London on 27 May 2022.

Background
ABBA informally split up in 1983, following the release of their retrospective greatest hits album The Singles: The First Ten Years in late 1982. Renewed interest in the band grew from the 1990s onwards following the worldwide success of their greatest hits album ABBA Gold, the ABBA-based musical Mamma Mia! and the subsequent film of the same name, followed by its 2018 sequel, Mamma Mia!  Here We Go Again, and the use of their songs in some other film soundtracks such as The Adventures of Priscilla, Queen of the Desert and Muriel's Wedding.

However, the members steadfastly refused to reunite. In 2000, they reportedly turned down an offer of $1 billion to perform again. In July 2008, Björn Ulvaeus categorically stated to The Sunday Telegraph, "We will never appear on stage again. There is simply no motivation to re-group." Ulvaeus reiterated this in a 2014 interview while promoting the publication of ABBA: The Official Photo Book.

On 6 June 2016, however, ABBA did informally reunite at a private party in Stockholm. This led to a more formal reunion. Two years later, in April 2018, they announced they had recorded two new songs, "I Still Have Faith in You" and "Don't Shut Me Down".

The new songs initially were intended to support both a TV special produced by NBC and the BBC and the ABBA Voyage tour which the TV special itself supported. However, this project was later cancelled in favour of the "ABBAtar" tour announced months prior.

One of the album's tracks, "Just a Notion", was previously partially included in a demo version as part of the medley "ABBA Undeleted" from the 1994 Thank You for the Music box set. The reworked song was released as a single two weeks before the album, on 22 October 2021. Whilst the vocals date from 1978, its instrumentation was mostly re-recorded.

Promotion and announcement
Promotion for Voyage began with the website abbavoyage.com, going live on 26 August 2021. Billboards were erected in London, and social media accounts titled "ABBA Voyage" were also set up. The band announced during a 2 September 2021 YouTube live stream that Voyage would be released on 5 November 2021. The two songs first announced in 2018, "I Still Have Faith in You" and "Don't Shut Me Down", were confirmed as the double-sided lead single from Voyage during the September 2021 live stream.

Tour

During the album announcement live stream, ABBA also announced a concert residency, known as ABBA Voyage, with concerts starting from 27 May 2022 in a custom-built venue at Queen Elizabeth Olympic Park in London.

ABBA first announced they were preparing digital avatars in September 2017. Dubbed the "ABBAtars", they will appear during the ABBA Voyage concerts in place of the four actual band members. To animate the avatars, the ABBA band members wore motion-capture suits and were filmed using 160 cameras, with graphics later added by Industrial Light & Magic, a visual effects company.

The ABBAtar tour was originally set for 2019, but was delayed due to technical issues. The COVID-19 pandemic then forced the band to push the tour back to 2022, it now turning into a seven-month residency in London. , no further tour locations have been announced.

Critical reception

Voyage was met with positive reviews from music critics. At Metacritic, which assigns a normalised rating out of 100 to reviews from professional publications, the album received an average score of 72 based on 16 reviews, indicating "generally favorable reviews". Aggregator AnyDecentMusic? gave it 7.1 out of 10, based on their assessment of the critical consensus.

Stephen Thomas Erlewine from AllMusic website gave the album three and a half stars out of five and noted that "Andersson and Ulvaeus wisely decided not to follow any stylistic trend or adopt any modern production technique" which made the songs "recognizably ABBA music". He also wrote that like all ABBA's albums "[it] brings the lows along with the highs" and called the album "unexpected and delightful".

Helen Brown from The Independent gave it a full rating of five out of five stars and noted that, as with songs from the 1970s albums, ABBA didn't try to follow the trend or "to update the gloriously gaudy vintage tinsel of their Eighties office party sound" and she stated that a lot of that comes from the fact that the song's creators, Bjorn and Benny, realized from the beginning, "it was their lack of freshness that struck a chord with everyone's inner outsider" and enabled them to have a long career.

In his review for The Telegraph, Neil McCormick wrote that "ABBA’s reputation was established as a consummate singles outfit rather than an album band", and none of the songs featured are as good as their hit singles. He concluded by stating that the result as a whole "is out-of-time rather than timeless".

Ed Potton from The Times magazine rated it with three stars out of five and stated that "Voyage is a reassuringly familiar blend of clear-eyed sentiment, outrageous musicality and utter indifference to fashion". He praised Frida (about whom he claimed to have noticed a stronger Swedish accent than usual, although he doesn't consider this a bad thing) and Agnetha's vocals, calling them "pristine and moving", and wrote that even though the "songs can sound naff on first listen yet you’re pulled in by Benny Andersson’s melodic oomph and Bjorn Ulvaeus eccentric lyrical insights".

Rob Sheffield from Rolling Stone gave the album four out of five stars and wrote that it's a surprise that the group has returned with new material and that "it’s a bigger, sweeter surprise that they returned so full of musical vitality. All these years after 'Waterloo', ABBA still refuse to surrender".

Commercial performance
Voyage sold more than 1 million units worldwide in its first week of release.
The album recorded 40,000 UK pre-orders in the first 24 hours following the announcement of its release. Three days after the album was announced, it had received over 80,000 pre-orders in the UK alone. This broke the record for the biggest pre-ordered album for Universal Music UK, previously held by Progress (2010) by Take That. By October 2021, the album had recorded 111,000 pre-orders. Advance orders in the Netherlands totalled 40,000 copies.

The album entered the UK Albums Chart at number one, with 204,000 chart sales, 90% (180,000) of which were physical sales. It was the biggest opening week for an album in the UK since Ed Sheeran's ÷ (2017), and became the fastest-selling album of 2021 as well as the fastest-selling vinyl LP of the 21st century, with 29,900 vinyl copies sold. It is ABBA's first number-one album since ABBA Gold, which topped the chart in 1992, 1999 and 2008. It became the 3rd biggest album of 2021 in the UK with 400,000 units and the 2nd best-selling album with 387,000 pure sales.

In Germany, the album also entered at number one on the albums chart with over 200,000 chart sales. In its first week, it sold more copies than the rest of the albums chart combined and also reached the top of the year-end albums chart for the time being. In Italy the album debuted at number six on the albums chart.

Voyage became ABBA's highest-charting album in the United States, entering the Billboard 200 at number two on 20 November 2021, beating their previous high of number 14 with ABBA: The Album in 1978. It opened with 82,000 album-equivalent units, including 78,000 album sales (60,500 of which were physical), making it the highest-selling album of the week.

According to IFPI, Voyage was the eighth best-selling album worldwide (all formats) and the second in album sales list. The album sold 2,050,000 copies in 2021, and over 2.5 million till November 2022.

Track listing

Personnel
ABBA
Anni-Frid Lyngstad – vocals (lead vocals on tracks 1, 8 and 9)
Agnetha Fältskog – vocals (lead vocals on tracks 4, 6 and 7)
Björn Ulvaeus – guitar, background vocals, co-producer, lyricist
Benny Andersson – vocals, piano, synthesizer, arrangements, mixing, producer

Other vocalists
The Children's Choir of Stockholm International School (track 3)

Other musicians
Jan Bengtson – baritone saxophone, flute
Mats Englund – bass (track 6)
Pär Grebacken – clarinet, recorder, tenor saxophone
Per Lindvall – drums, percussion
Lasse Jonsson – guitar
Lasse Wellander – guitar
Margareta Bengtson – harp

Production and design
Görel Hanser – coordinator
Baillie Walsh – design
Bernard Löhr – engineer, programming, mixing
Linn Fijal – engineer
Vilma Colling – engineer
Björn Engelmann – mastering
Kimberley Akester – music director, Children's Choir of the Stockholm International School (track 3)
Anneli Thompson – musical assistance, Children's Choir of the Stockholm International School (track 3)
Göran Arnberg – orchestrator/conductor, Stockholm Concert Orchestra (track 10)

Charts

Weekly charts

Year-end charts

Certifications and sales

Release history

References

External links
Official ABBA Voyage website

2021 albums
ABBA albums
Albums produced by Benny Andersson
Albums produced by Björn Ulvaeus
Polar Music albums